Claude Henry St Leonard Toovey (24 November 1896 – 28 January 1978) was an Australian rules footballer who played with Fitzroy in the Victorian Football League (VFL).

Notes

External links 

1896 births
1978 deaths
Australian rules footballers from South Australia
Norwood Football Club players
Fitzroy Football Club players
Ballarat Football Club players